A Different Kind of Weather is the third and final studio album by the English band the Dream Academy. It was released on 15 June 1990 by Reprise and Blanco y Negro Records. The album saw the return of David Gilmour as the main producer, six years after he had produced their debut album.

The album failed to enter the charts, despite the band performing their first and only tour of the United Kingdom to promote its release, in 1991.

Critical reception
Trouser Press wrote that "[Kate] St. John’s oboe and soprano sax is an effective antidote to blandness, but the languid material is almost characterless, relegating the album to handsomely accomplished ambience for the old at heart." The Globe and Mail wrote that the album "harks back to the days of the British progressives without specifically copying any one band."

Track listing

Singles from the album
"Love"
"Angel of Mercy" ("Twelve-eight Angel")

References

1991 albums
Albums produced by David Gilmour
Blanco y Negro Records albums
Reprise Records albums
The Dream Academy albums